The 1972 Rebel 400 was a NASCAR Winston Cup Series event that was held on April 16, 1972 at Darlington Speedway in Darlington, South Carolina.

Race results

References 

NASCAR races at Darlington Raceway
Rebel 400
Rebel 400
Rebel 400